Aotizhongxin is an interchange station on lines 2 and 9 of the Shenyang Metro. The line 2 station opened on 30 December 2011, and the line 9 station opened on 25 May 2019.

Station Layout

References 

Railway stations in China opened in 2011
Shenyang Metro stations